Jay Dee Springbett (1975 – 30 June 2011), was a British Australian record executive who appeared as a judge on the singing competition Australian Idol during the show's seventh season in 2009. Springbett was one of three judges, along with Ian Dickson and Marcia Hines.

Career 
Springbett, an executive with Sony Music Entertainment in Britain, moved from his native United Kingdom to Australia in 2004. He worked in the artists and repertoire department at Sony Music Australia. He helped launch or manage the careers of well-known Sony artists and pop singers, including Jessica Mauboy and Human Nature.

Personal life 
In January 2010, Springbett split from his fiancee with whom he had two daughters.

On 30 June 2011, Springbett was found dead at his apartment in Woolloomooloo in non-suspicious circumstances.

References

1975 births
2011 deaths
British music industry executives
Australian music industry executives
Australian television personalities
British expatriates in Australia